Indian Mound is a natural land formation which overlooks the mostly dry river bed of the Arkansas River at what was Chouteau's Island.

It was a landmark used to distinguish between the Mountain route or the Cimarron route of the Santa Fe Trail.

References

Natural features on the National Register of Historic Places in Kansas
Kearny County, Kansas
Santa Fe Trail